Sargis Lukyani Lukashin (born Sargis Srapionyan (Սրապիոնյան); 1883 or 1885 – 1937) was an Armenian Bolshevik politician and Soviet statesman.

Biography 

Lukashin was born in 1883 or 1885 in the Armenian-populated city of New Nakhichevan near Rostov-on-Don in Russia. He studied law at the Petersburg University and graduated in 1910. At first a supporter of the Armenian Social-Democratic Labour Organization, he joined the Bolshevik Party in 1906.

He participated in the Bolsheviks' armed rebellion during the October Revolution, after which he fought on the Southern Front of the Russian Civil War in the Don region. In 1918 he worked in the 
VCheka and as the secretary of the Moscow regional bureau of the Bolshevik Party. In 1919 he returned to the Don region and occupied various positions there until 1921.

From 1921 to 1922 he was the First Secretary of the Communist Party of Armenia. Between 1922 and 1925 was the Chairman of the Council of People's Commissars of the Armenian SSR (equivalent of a Prime Minister). He oversaw the normalization of conditions and the first steps of industrialization in the Armenian SSR, which was suffering from a severe refugee crisis, famine, and disease in the early 1920's. From 1925 to 1928 he was Vice Chairman of the Council of People's Commissars of the Transcaucasian SFSR and occupied various ministerial positions.

From 1928 to 1937 he occupied various positions at the union level having to do with construction and heavy industry. He was arrested and executed in 1937 during the Great Purge. A number of settlements, streets, and schools in Armenia are named after him.

References

1883 births
1937 deaths
Old Bolsheviks
Communist Party of Armenia (Soviet Union) politicians
Great Purge victims from Armenia
Russian people of Armenian descent
Armenian atheists
Politicians from Rostov-on-Don
Heads of government of the Armenian Soviet Socialist Republic
Members of the Communist Party of the Soviet Union executed by the Soviet Union